Parepalpus is a genus of flies in the family Tachinidae.

Species
P. flavidus Coquillett, 1902

References

Tachininae
Tachinidae genera
Taxa named by Daniel William Coquillett